Clare Harris may refer to:

 Clare Winger Harris (1891–1968), science fiction writer 
 Clare Harris (anthropologist) (born 1965), British anthropologist and academic

See also
 Clara Harris
 Claire Harris (disambiguation)
 Harris (disambiguation)
 Clare (disambiguation)